The Bishop of Norwich is the ordinary of the Church of England Diocese of Norwich in the Province of Canterbury. The diocese covers most of the county of Norfolk and part of Suffolk. The bishop of Norwich is Graham Usher.

The see is in the city of Norwich and the seat is located at the Cathedral Church of the Holy and Undivided Trinity. The bishop's residence is Bishop's House, Norwich. It is claimed that the bishop is also the abbot of St Benet's Abbey, the contention being that instead of dissolving this monastic institution, Henry VIII united the position of abbot with that of bishop of Norwich, making St Benet's perhaps the only monastic institution to escape de jure dissolution, although it was despoiled by its last abbot.

East Anglia has had a bishopric since 630, when the first cathedral was founded at Dommoc, possibly to be identified as the submerged village of Dunwich. In 673, the see was divided into the bishoprics of Dunwich and Elmham; which were reunited by mid-950s, with the seat located at Elmham. After the Conquest the seat was moved in 1070 to Thetford, before finally being located in Norwich in 1094 under William II, ahead of the completion of the new cathedral building.

History

In about 630 or 631, a diocese was established by St. Felix for the Kingdom of the East Angles, with his episcopal seat at Dunwich on the Suffolk coast. In 672, the diocese was divided into the sees of Dunwich and Elmham by St. Theodore, Archbishop of Canterbury.

The line of bishops of Elmham continued until it was interrupted by the Danish Viking invasions in the late 9th and early 10th centuries. By the mid 950s, the sees of Elmham and Dunwich were reunited under one bishop, with the episcopal see at Elmham. After the Norman conquest, the see was transferred to Thetford in 1075, and soon afterwards to Norwich in 1094.

Though the see took the name Norwich in the 11th century, its history goes back 500 years earlier, to the final conversion of the kingdom of East Anglia by St Felix. The East Angles became Christian during the reign of Sigeberht, who succeeded to the kingdom in 628. Felix fixed his see at Dommoc, which may have been at Dunwich, now almost entirely submerged off the coast of Suffolk. From there he evangelized the areas corresponding to the modern counties of Norfolk, Suffolk and Cambridgeshire, which later were to form the diocese of Norwich. He was succeeded in turn by Thomas in 647, Brigilsus (died about 669) and Bifus. Upon the death of Bifus, in 673 Theodore, the Archbishop of Canterbury, divided the see between Dunwich and Elmham.

The see of Elmham came to an end in about 870, after the East Anglian king Edmund and the bishop Humbertus were murdered by the Danes. East Anglia was ravaged, the churches and monasteries destroyed, and Christianity was only practised with difficulty. Wilred, Bishop of Dunwich seems then to have reunited the dioceses, choosing Elmham as his see. The line of his successors at Elmham then descended to Herfast, a chaplain to William the Conqueror, who removed his see to Thetford Priory and died in 1084.

Herbert de Losinga obtained his appointment in 1091 by means of a simoniacal gift to King William Rufus to secure his election, but being subsequently struck with remorse went to Rome in 1094 to obtain absolution from the pope. Herbert founded a priory in Norwich in expiation for his sin and at the same time moved his see there from Thetford in 1094 under William. The See of Thetford was formed when Herfast moved the episcopal see from Elmham to Thetford in 1075. This short-lived see continued until it was moved to Norwich in 1094. The chapter of secular canons was dissolved and monks took their place. The foundation-stone of the new cathedral at Norwich was laid in 1096, in honour of the Blessed Trinity. By the time of his death in 1119, Herbert de Losinga had completed the choir, which is apsidal and encircled by a procession path, and which originally gave access to three Norman chapels. His successor, Everard, completed the long Norman nave so that the cathedral is a very early twelfth-century building, modified naturally by later additions and alterations. The chief of these is the Lady Chapel (c. 1250, destroyed by the Protestant Dean Gardiner  1573–1589); the cloisters (c. 1300), the West Window (c. 1440), the rood screen, the spire and the vault spanning the nave (c. 1450). The cathedral suffered much from iconoclasm during the Reformation and the civil wars.

The Norwich diocese consisted of Norfolk and Suffolk with some parts of Cambridgeshire, being divided into four archdeaconries: Norfolk, Norwich, Suffolk, and Sudbury. At the end of the seventeenth century there were 1,121 parish-churches, and this number had probably not changed much since Catholic times.

The main religious houses in the medieval diocese were the Benedictine Abbeys of Bury St Edmunds, Wymondham, and St Benet's of Hulme, the cathedral priory of Norwich, along with the Cistercian Abbey of Sibton, the only Cistercian Abbey in East Anglia (the ruins now privately owned by the Levett-Scrivener family), and the abbeys of the Augustinian Canons at Wendling, Langley, and Laystone. Both Dominican and Franciscan convents were to be found at Lynn, Norwich, Yarmouth, Dunwich, and Ipswich, while the Dominicans also had houses at Thetford and Sudbury and the Franciscans at Bury St Edmund's and at Walsingham, where the great shrine of Our Lady was, a foundation of Augustinian canons. The Carmelites were at Lynn, Norwich, Yarmouth, and Blakeney; and the Austin Friars at Norwich, Lynn, and Orford.

The last bishop before the start of the English Reformation was Richard Nykke (succeeded 1501), who was succeeded by William Rugg in 1536. After him came in 1550 Thomas Thirlby, who had already been appointed Bishop of Westminster by the King alone but was reconciled to the Pope in the reign of Queen Mary. After him in 1554 came John Hopton, the last Bishop of Norwich in communion with Rome, who died in 1558. In the early 17th century, Bishop Wren urged the restoration and beautification of churches, much previously neglected, and the use of copes in worship against a background of resistance. Several successors including Richard Montagu a public controversialist, continued attempts to restore a degree of catholic worship. However, Norwich was heavily influenced by Puritanism and in 1643, a Puritan mob invaded the cathedral and destroyed all Catholic symbols. (The bishop of the day, Joseph Hall, wrote despairingly of the despoliation, in his book, Hard Measures). Almost in ruins, the cathedral would be repaired at the Restoration.

List of bishops of Norwich

Bishops at Elmham and at Thetford

Pre-Reformation bishops

Bishops during the Reformation

Post-Reformation bishops

Assistant bishops

Among those who have served the diocese as assistant bishops have been:
1450–1477: Thomas Scrope, absentee (or former) Bishop of Dromore and assistant Bishop of Canterbury in 1469. Consecrated 1 February 1450, by Angelo Capranica, Archbishop of Ascoli Piceno, at Santa Maria in Aquiro.  Also called Thomas (de) Bradley for his Leicestershire birthplace; Carmelite monk; vicar-general to the bishop of Norwich; died 1491/2 — allegedly aged 100 — in Lowestoft, where he was buried.
19311951 (d.): Edwin Robins, Vicar of Wicklewood (until 1947) and former bishop of Athabasca
1953–1955: Wilfrid Belcher, Rector of Diss and former Bishop of North Queensland

Port-passing etiquette

When port wine is passed around at British meals, one tradition dictates that a diner passes the decanter to the left immediately after pouring a glass for his or her neighbour on the right; the decanter should not stop its clockwise progress around the table until it is finished. If someone is seen to have failed to follow tradition, the breach is brought to their attention by asking "Do you know the Bishop of Norwich?"; those aware of the tradition treat the question as a reminder, while those who don't are told "He's a terribly good chap, but he always forgets to pass the port."

This custom almost certainly owes its origins to an incident at Christ's College, Cambridge in 1785, when Lewis Bagot, the then Bishop of Norwich, dined with the Master and Fellows. The bishop was a notable example of the epicurean clergymen of the period and he applied himself with zeal to the port, to the near complete exclusion of his fellow diners. Nothing was said, but when the bishop entered the college chapel the following day to preach a sermon he discovered the following pasquinade attached to the lectern.

The Bishop of Norwich is fond of his Port.
Too fond, for the Villain won't pass when he ought.

References

Citations

Bibliography

External links

Episcopal succession in Anglo-Saxon England

 
Norwich
Bishops of Norwich